Akyaka ( Şoregil or Şöregel,  or ,) is a district of Kars Province in eastern Turkey, and the name of the small town that is the district's administrative capital. It is located on Turkey's closed border with Armenia. The population was 2,273 in 2010.

Government 
Ergüder Toptaş was elected mayor in the local elections in March 2019. Nur Seninç Özbek serves as Kaymakam.

Etymology 
The settlement was known as Şuregel or Kızılçakçak whilst part of the Russian Empire—until 1961 when it was renamed Akyaka. Nowadays, the town is referred to by its Azerbaijani and Karapapakh residents as Ağyaxa or Şörəyəl. 

In the town's original name Kızılçakçak, kızıl may refer to bright red in Turkish or gold in Azerbaijani, whilst çak refers to something strong, precise or in high measure in Turkic.

History 
Akyaka was a district between 1922 and 1926 and a township in the Arpaçay district between 1926 and 1988. The Akyaka municipality was established in 1972.

Transport 
Akyaka is a border checkpoint on the railway into Armenia, which has been closed since 1993. The route  from Kars runs next to the railway leading to the border.

Demographics 
The town—then known as Kızılçakçak—was exclusively Armenian during the Russian Empire whilst it was part of the Kars Okrug of the Kars Oblast. Following the conclusion of the Turkish–Armenian war and Turkey's annexation of the region, Azerbaijanis and Karapapakhs who had fled from Armenia in 1918–1920 settled in Akyaka, replacing the Armenian population which was expelled in 1920. Nowadays, Azerbaijanis form 50% of the population, Sunni Karapapakhs 45%, and Kurds and others form the remaining 5%.

References 

Towns in Turkey
Armenia–Turkey border crossings
 
Populated places in Kars Province